Gerald Blake (3 December 1928 – 5 April 1991) was a British television director who worked in drama from the 1960s to the 1980s.

His numerous credits include The Gentle Touch, The Omega Factor (the episode "After-Image"),  Blake's 7 (the episodes "The Harvest of Kairos" (1980) and "Death-Watch" (1980) from the third series), Survivors (three episodes from the first series), The Onedin Line, Out of the Unknown, Doctor Who (the stories The Abominable Snowmen (1967) and The Invasion of Time (1978)), Dr. Finlay's Casebook, Compact, Z-Cars, Mr. Palfrey of Westminster, and Coronation Street.

References

External links
 

1928 births
1991 deaths
British television directors